Caloptilia juglandiella is a moth of the family Gracillariidae. It is known from the United States (including Kentucky, Maine, Ohio and Missouri).

The larvae feed on Juglans nigra. They mine the leaves of their host plant. The mine is found on the underside of the leaf.

References

juglandiella
Moths of North America
Moths described in 1872